We Stand Tall is a 1990 music video produced by the Church of Scientology. It features many individuals, including  Scientology leader, David Miscavige. Many of the participants have either come to publicly criticize the practices of the Church or have disappeared.

In the video, a chorus of Scientologists is seen singing the title song, with several of the organization's executives in the front and second row. From left to right are Shelly Miscavige, Ray Mithoff, Marc Yager, Mark Ingber, Mike Rinder, David Miscavige, Heber Jentzsch, Greg Wilhere, Mark Rathbun, and Guillaume Lesevre. Rinder and Jentzsch are in the second row. The video also shows Dianetics sessions, Volunteer Ministers passing out The Way to Happiness books, historical clips of L. Ron Hubbard lecturing and displaying the E-meter, several celebrities who are Scientologists, including John Travolta, several of the Church of Scientology properties including Saint Hill Manor, clips from 1988 promotional events announcing OTVIII, the new Mark Super VII model E-Meter, and the christening ceremony for the Freewinds ship.

Reception
The video was parodied by Saturday Night Live in the show's 40th season in 2015.  The pre-recorded sketch takes the form of a music video from 1990 for the fictional and legally distinct organization Neurotology.  The music video has been updated with on-screen annotations regarding the whereabouts of the participants, many of whom are said to have left the organization or have died.  A great many more of the participants are simply listed as "missing," a reference to individuals like Shelly Miscavige, who some have alleged is missing, while others claim she has been imprisoned by the Church.

References

External links
 SNL parody video

1990 songs
1990s music videos
Religious songs
Scientology media